Cymindis chevrolati is a species of ground beetle in the subfamily Harpalinae. It was described by Pierre François Marie Auguste Dejean in 1836.

References

chevrolati
Beetles described in 1836